Christophe Point (born 26 May 1965 in Nantes) is a French retired football defender.

Point spent his entire playing career of 14 years at Stade Malherbe Caen.

External links
Christophe Point profile at footballdatabase.eu

1965 births
Living people
Footballers from Nantes
French footballers
Stade Malherbe Caen players
Ligue 1 players
Ligue 2 players
French football managers
Association football defenders